Chhedi Paswan (born 4 February 1956) is a former member of 16th Lok Sabha and a former member of Bihar Legislative Assembly. He represents the Bharatiya Janata Party (BJP) since 2014. At various points, he has been with Janata Party, then its Charan Singh faction, then the reunited Janata Dal, Bahujan Samaj Party, Nationalist Congress Party, Lalu Prasad Yadav's RJD and Nitish Kumar's JD(U).

Career 
He lost 1980 Bihar vidhan sabha election as member of Charan Singh faction from Chenari constituency. Between 1985–89, he was a Member of the Legislative Assembly of Bihar, where he represented the Lok Dal party from the Chenari. He was Secretary General of the Yuva Lok Dal in Bihar between 1987–89.

Paswan was elected to the Lok Sabha, the lower house of the Parliament of India, in 1989 and 1991 as a Janata Dal candidate from Sasaram constituency, defeating Meira Kumar of the Indian National Congress party on both occasions. He lost the 1996 Lok Sabha election to Muni Lall of the BJP. He also lost Lok Sabha election from Sasaram in 1998 as member of NCP and in 1999 as member of BSP. He was then elected to Bihar Vidhan Sabha (2000-2005) from Chenari as member of Lalu Prasad's RJD. He then joined Nitish Kumar's Janata Dal (United) and lost election from Mohania seat in February 2005, and won from there in October 2005 and 2010.

He defected to the BJP in 2014 from Janata Dal (United) after alleging party leader Nitish Kumar was acting in an autocratic manner.  He contested the 2014 Lok Sabha election and won the Sasaram seat but the victory was set aside by the Patna High Court on the grounds that his election affidavit did not mention criminal cases pending against him. The Supreme Court of India stayed the order but Paswan's voting rights were not restored, which prevented him from voting in the 2017 Presidential elections.

Personal life 
Paswan was born on 4 February 1956 in Sasaram to Ramchandra Paswan and Laxmina Devi. He was awarded a M.A. degree in  Labour and Social Welfare from the Patna University. He is married to Premkali Devi. He has three sons and two daughters.

References 

1956 births
Living people
India MPs 1989–1991
India MPs 1991–1996
Lok Sabha members from Bihar
People from Sasaram
People from Rohtas District
India MPs 2014–2019
Janata Dal politicians
Lok Dal politicians
Samata Party politicians
Janata Dal (United) politicians
Bharatiya Janata Party politicians from Bihar
Rashtriya Janata Dal politicians
Bahujan Samaj Party politicians
Patna University alumni
India MPs 2019–present